Methylparaben, also methyl paraben, one of the parabens, is a preservative with the chemical formula CH3(C6H4(OH)COO). It is the methyl ester of p-hydroxybenzoic acid.

Natural occurrences 
Methylparaben serves as a pheromone for a variety of insects and is a component of queen mandibular pheromone.

It is a pheromone in wolves produced during estrus associated with the behavior of alpha male wolves preventing other males from mounting females in heat.

Uses 
Methylparaben is an anti-fungal agent often used in a variety of cosmetics and personal-care products. It is also used as a food preservative and has the E number E218.

Methylparaben is commonly used as a fungicide in Drosophila food media at 0.1%. To Drosophila, methylparaben is toxic at higher concentrations, has an estrogenic effect (mimicking estrogen in rats and having anti-androgenic activity), and slows the growth rate in the larval and pupal stages at 0.2%.

Safety 
There is controversy about whether methylparaben or propylparabens are harmful at concentrations typically used in body care or cosmetics.  Methylparaben and propylparaben are considered generally recognized as safe (GRAS) by the USFDA for food and cosmetic antibacterial preservation.  Methylparaben is readily metabolized by common soil bacteria, making it completely biodegradable.

Methylparaben is readily absorbed from the gastrointestinal tract or through the skin. It is hydrolyzed to p-hydroxybenzoic acid and rapidly excreted in urine without accumulating in the body.  Acute toxicity studies have shown that methylparaben is practically non-toxic by both oral and parenteral administration in animals. In a population with normal skin, methylparaben is practically non-irritating and non-sensitizing; however, allergic reactions to ingested parabens have been reported. A 2008 study found no competitive binding for human estrogen and androgen receptors for methylparaben, but varying levels of competitive binding were seen with butyl- and isobutyl-paraben.

Studies indicate that methylparaben applied on the skin may react with UVB, leading to increased skin aging and DNA damage.

References

External links 
 Methylparaben at Hazardous Substances Data Bank
 Methylparaben  at Household Products Database
 European Commission Scientific Committee on Consumer Products Extended Opinion on the Safety Evaluation of Parabens (2005) 

Methyl esters
Parabens
E-number additives
Semiochemicals
Insect pheromones
ja:メチルパラベン